Group D of the 2015 Africa Cup of Nations qualification tournament was one of the seven groups to decide the teams which qualified for the 2015 Africa Cup of Nations finals tournament. Group D consisted of four teams: Cameroon, Ivory Coast, DR Congo, and Sierra Leone, who played against each other home-and-away in a round-robin format.

Standings

Matches

Goalscorers 
4 goals:

 Vincent Aboubakar
 Salomon Kalou

3 goals:

 Clinton N'Jie
 Jeremy Bokila

2 goals:

 Gervinho
 Max Gradel
 Yaya Touré
 Yannick Bolasie
 Cédric Mongongu

1 goals:

 Léonard Kweuke
 Stéphane Mbia
 Junior Kabananga
 Neeskens Kebano
 Ndombe Mubele
 Wilfried Bony
 Seydou Doumbia
 Kolo Touré
 Kei Kamara
 Moustapha Bangura
 Mohamed Kamara

Discipline

Notes

References

External links 
Orange Africa Cup Of Nations Qualifiers, CAFonline.com

Group D
qual
Africa
2014 in Sierra Leonean sport